John Bryant (1832 – 1926) was a Welsh harpist. He was born in Castellau, Llantrisant, Glamorganshire. As a competent player of the pedal harp he attended and performed at many Eisteddfodau and concerts in South Wales, he also served as adjudicator on some occasions.

He is known to have arranged various ‘Merch Megan’ variations for the harp.

He died in early 1926, and is buried in the graveyard of Tabernacl, Efail Isaf.

References 

Welsh harpists
1832 births
1926 deaths